Sisters Over Flowers or Jiejie Over Flowers is a Chinese travel-reality show broadcast on SMG: Dragon Television.

It starred Xi Meijuan, Xu Fan, Wang Lin, Lin Chi-ling, Victoria (eps 1-1 to 1-5),  Yang Zi (eps 1-5 to 1-12), Ma Tianyu, and Aarif Rahman as they go on a 19-day backpacking trip through Turkey and Italy.

Cast

Season 1

Season 2

References

External links
旅途的花樣

2015 Chinese television series debuts
Chinese variety television shows
Chinese-language television shows
Chinese television series based on South Korean television series
2015 Chinese television series endings
Dragon Television original programming